Dimitri Gvindadze (born December 23, 1973) is a Georgian economist and politician who has been the country's Minister of Finance from June 20, 2011, to August 13, 2012.

Education and early career

Born in Tbilisi, then-Soviet Georgia, Gvindadze graduated from the Tbilisi State Technical University with a degree in civil engineering in 1995. He then studied at the Diplomatic Academy of Paris (1998), International Institute of Social Studies in The Hague (2001), and the John F. Kennedy School of Government at Harvard University (2003–2005), and went through a Financial Programming and Policy course at the International Monetary Fund Institute (2007).

From 1994 to 2003, Gvindadze served on various positions at the Ministry of Foreign Affairs of Georgia. In July 2005, he was appointed Deputy Minister of Finance. He was in charge of foreign debt, cooperation with the international financial institutions and bilateral donors. When nominating Gvindadze to the post of Minister of Finance, the Prime Minister of Georgia Nika Gilauri noted that owing to Gvindadze's successful work as a Deputy Minister it was made possible to issue USD 500 million eurobonds in April 2011 to refinance the previous one.

Minister of Finance
Dimitri Gvindadze was appointed Minister of Finance on June 20, 2011, succeeding Kakha Baindurashvili. On August 13, 2012, he was, in turn, replaced with Alexander Khetaguri, hitherto Minister for Energy.

.

References

See also
Cabinet of Georgia

Economists from Georgia (country)
Finance ministers of Georgia
Government ministers of Georgia (country)
1973 births
Politicians from Tbilisi
Living people
Harvard Kennedy School alumni
21st-century politicians from Georgia (country)